Highway 92 is a north-south highway in northeastern Israel.  It follows the eastern edge of the Kinneret from Ma'agan junction in the south at Highway 98 to Yehudiya junction in the north at Highway 87.  It is 24 km long.

Junctions & Interchanges on the highway

Places of interest near Highway 92
 Kibbutz HaOn
 Monument for Turkish soldiers
 Sussita archaeological site
 Kursi national park
 Luna-Gal beach
 Bethsaida, Bethsaida Valley and

See also
List of highways in Israel

92